Pune Metropolitan Region (PMR) is the metropolitan region around the city of Pune. According to practical purposes, PMR comprises two Municipal Corporations of PMC, PCMC and three Cantonment Boards, spread over an area of 7,256.46 km2. The population of the region as per 2011 census was 7,541,946.

The Pune Metropolitan Region Development Authority (PMRDA) is the planning and development authority of the region formed. PMRDA is headed by the Chief Minister of Maharashtra, Eknath Shinde. Suhas Diwase, IAS, is the chief executive officer. The authority is responsible for various town planning schemes, Pune Ring Road as well as Pune Metro (Line 3).

Jurisdiction 
Pune Metropolitan Region is spread over 3 talukas of the Pune district. It includes the entirety of Pune City and Pimpri Chinchwad talukas, and the Dehu Road cantonment of Haveli taluka. The prominent urban local self-governing bodies in the region are as follows:

Municipal Corporations 

 Pune Municipal Corporation
 Pimpri Chinchwad Municipal Corporation

Cantonment Boards 

 Pune Cantonment Board
 Khadki Cantonment Board
 Dehu Road Cantonment Board

See also

 Pune Metropolitan Region Development Authority

References 

Cities and towns in Pune district
Pimpri-Chinchwad
 
Metropolitan areas of India